The Scoglio d'Africa  (or Scoglio d'Affrica) also named Formica di Monte Cristo ("Monte Cristo's Ant"), is a solitary small skerry belonging to the Tuscan Archipelago located in open sea between the Tyrrhenian Sea and the Corsica Channel. Administratively it belongs to the municipality of Portoferraio. It is also part of the Tuscan Archipelago National Park.

Description
Regarding its size and its shape, it can be considered to all effects an emergent rock in a stretch of shallow sea.
Geologically the skerry belongs to a submarine ridge starting few miles east of Capraia and it extends toward south up to reach Pianosa.
The depths in the region among the skerry and Montecristo reach .

Fauna
The seabed around the rock is composed by two types of biocoenosis; the first is formed by algae, bryozoa and polychaetes that form a structure rich in cavities; the second is formed by prairies of Posidonia.

See also
 Scoglio d'Africa Lighthouse

References

Islands of Tuscany
Province of Livorno
Arcipelago Toscano National Park